A 56 kbit/s line is a digital connection capable of carrying 56 kilobits per second (kbit/s), or 56,000 bit/s, the data rate of a classical single channel digital telephone line in North America. Since the wide deployment of faster, cheaper technologies, 56 kbit/s lines are generally considered to be an obsolete technology.

Speed derivation
The figure of 56 kbit/s is derived from its implementation using the same digital infrastructure used since the 1960s for digital telephony in the public switched telephone network, which uses a sampling rate of 8,000 Hz for PCM audio with 8-bit audio bit depth to encode analogue signals into a digital stream of 64,000 bit/s. However, in the T-carrier systems used in the US and Canada, a technique called bit-robbing uses, in every sixth frame, the least significant bit for Channel Associated Signaling (CAS).

See also 
56 kbit/s modem
DS0
ISDN
Switch56
V.90

References 

Telecommunications standards
Obsolete technologies
Telecommunication protocols